The Danakil Desert is a desert in northeast Ethiopia, southern Eritrea, and northwestern Djibouti. Situated in the Afar Triangle, it stretches across  of arid terrain. It is inhabited by a few Afar, who engage in salt mining. The area is known for its volcanoes and extreme heat, with daytime temperatures surpassing . The Danakil Desert is one of the lowest and hottest places on Earth.

Climate
Dallol (92 metres below sea level), has the highest average temperature recorded on earth:

Geology

Local geology is characterized by volcanic and tectonic activity, various climate cycles, and discontinuous erosion. The basic geological structure of this area was caused by the movement of tectonic plates as Africa moved away from Asia. Mountain chains formed and were eroded again during the Paleozoic. Inundations by the sea caused the formation of layers of sandstone, and limestone was deposited further offshore. As the land rose again, further sandstone formed above the limestone. Further tectonic shifts caused lava to pour out of cracks and cover the sedimentary deposits.

The Danakil Desert has a number of lakes formed by lava flows that dammed up several valleys. Among these is Lake Afrera, which has thick saline crusts on its banks. Other areas of the Danakil became sinks, dry endorheic basins as precipitation evaporates faster than it can collect in permanent lakes.  The area is flanked toward the east by the Danakil Alps, a tabular mountain system that has a few volcanic cones which peak in height in Mount Ramlo. 

The Afrera contains many active volcanoes, including the Maraho, Dabbahu, Afdera and Erta Ale.

Human presence
The Afar people mine salt, loading each of their camels with up to thirty salt bricks weighing four kilograms each. It will then take two days to get to the nearest town, with guards watching the camels and guarding them from bandits. There is a project to flood the depression by carrying out a channel from the ocean.

See also
 Eritrean coastal desert
 Guban desert

References

External links 

Afar Region
Ecoregions of Djibouti
Ecoregions of Eritrea
Ecoregions of Ethiopia
Geography of Djibouti
Geography of Eritrea
Deserts of Ethiopia
Great Rift Valley